The Battle of Corbridge took place on the banks of the River Tyne near the village of Corbridge in Northumberland in the year 918.

The battle was referenced in the Annals of Ulster and the Chronicle of the Kings of Alba. The battle was fought between Norse-Gael leader Ragnall ua Ímair and his allies against the forces of Constantín mac Áeda, King of Scotland together with those of Ealdred I of Bamburgh who had previously been driven from his lands by Ragnall. The Historia de Sancto Cuthberto adds that English fought alongside Norsemen. The Annals of Ulster informs us that the Norse army divided itself into four columns, in one of which may have been Jarl Ottir Iarla, a long-time ally of Ragnall.

The Scots destroyed the first three columns, but were ambushed by the last. This unit had remained hidden behind a hill and was commanded by Ragnall. The Scots, however, managed to escape without disaster. It seems that it was an indecisive engagement, although it did allow Ragnall to further establish himself in Northumbria. In 919, Ragnall descended on York where he took the city and had himself proclaimed king. The Bernicians remained under him, although Ealdred I of Bamburgh and Domnall I, king of Strathclyde, paid homage to the king of England.

In 1950, F. T. Wainwright argued that there were two battles of Corbridge in 914 and 918, and his view was widely accepted for over fifty years, but since around 2006 historians have taken the view that there was only one battle in 918.

Notes

References

Other sources

  Also JSTOR.
Stenton, Sir Frank M. Anglo-Saxon England Third Edition. Oxford University Press, 1971.

Corbridge
Corbridge
Anglo-Norse England
Corbridge
918
10th century in England
Military history of Northumberland
Corbridge
Corbridge